Some of My Best Friends are Men is a Canadian women's issues television series which aired on CBC Television in 1975.

Premise
The series took a humorous approach to feminist topics during International Women's Year. One recurring segment featured Dave Broadfoot who portrayed a male chauvinist and was pied for his behaviour. Florynce Kennedy also hosted a regular opinion segment. A "Shiny Golden Porker" award was announced to identify cases of media sexism. Subjects included men who look after their children following separation, and the legality of prostitution. Series host was television producer  Maxine Samuels (The Forest Rangers).

Scheduling
This half-hour series was broadcast Thursdays at 10:30 p.m. (Eastern time) from 11 September to 13 November 1975.

See also
 Ms! (CBC Television, 1973)

References

External links
 
 

CBC Television original programming
1975 Canadian television series debuts
1975 Canadian television series endings